This is a list of notable schools in Nigeria.

Abia State 

Government College Umuahia
Ngwa High School, Aba

Akwa Ibom State

 Federal Government College, Ikot Ekpene, Ikot Ekpene
 Holy Family College, Abak
 Lutheran High School, Obot Idim, Ibesikpo Asutan

Anambra State

 Bishop Crowther Seminary, Works Road, Awka
 Christ the King College, Onitsha
 Grundtvig International Secondary School, Oba

Delta State 

 Hussey College Warri

Ebonyi State 

 Government Secondary School, Afikpo

Edo State

 Auntie Maria School, Benin City
 Edo College, Benin City
 Federal Government Girls College, Benin
 Lumen Christi International High School, Uromi
 Nosakhare Model Educational Centre, Benin City
 Presentation National High School, Benin City
 University Preparatory Secondary School, Benin City

Federal Capital Territory

 Bristol Academy, Abuja
 Destiny Christian Academy, Airport road, Lugbe, Abuja.
 Kuje Science Primary School
 Ladela Secondary School, Abuja
 Loyola Jesuit College
 Olumawu Basic Education School
 School for the Gifted, Gwagwalada
 Whiteplains British School, Jabi,  Abuja

Imo State

 Federal Government Girls' College, Owerri
 Government Secondary School, Owerri
 Ray Jacobs Boarding School, Mgbidi

Kaduna State

 Barewa College, Zaria

Kano State

 Dawakin Tofa Science College

Kogi State 

 Titcombe College Egbe

Kwara State 

 Landmark University Secondary School
 Federal Government Girls College, Omu-Aran
 Unilorin Secondary School

Lagos State

 Apata Memorial High School, Ireakari Estate, Isolo, Lagos
 Atlantic Hall, Poka Epe Lagos
 Babington Macaulay Junior Seminary, Ikorodu, Lagos 
 British International School Lagos, Ikoyi, Lagos
 CMS Grammar School, Lagos
 D-Ivy College, Ikeja Lagos
 Ebun Pro Veritas International School, Oregun, Ikeja, Lagos 
 Faith Academy, Gowon Estate
 Federal Government College, Ijanikin, Lagos
 First Island School, Lekki, Lagos
 Government College Ikorodu
 Holy Child College, Obalende, south-west, Ikoyi, Lagos.
 Igbobi College, Yaba
 Ikenna Stars Academy, Ojo
 International School Lagos, University of Lagos, Akoka
 King's College, Lagos
 Lagos Baptist Academy, Obanikoro
 Meadow Hall School Lekki, Lagos
 Methodist Boys' High School, Victoria Island, Lagos.
 Queen's College, Lagos, Yaba
 Rainbow College, Lagos
 St Gregory's College, South-west Ikoyi, Lagos
 State High School

Nasarawa State

Government Secondary School Usha Kadu

Niger State

Federal Government Girls College, Bida

Ogun State

 Abeokuta Grammar School, Abeokuta
 Asero High School, Asero
 Ijebu Ode Grammar School, Ijebu Ode
 Baptist Boys' High School, Abeokuta
 Comprehensive High School, Aiyetoro
 Covenant University Secondary School, Covenant University
 Faith Academy, Ota
 Federal Government College, Odogbolu
 Lisabi Grammar School, Abeokuta
 Louisville Girls High School, Itele
 Mayflower School, Ikenne
 Nigerian Navy Secondary School, Abeokuta

Osun State 

 Federal Government Girls College, Ipetumodu
 Olashore International School
 Saint Anthony's Catholic High School

Oyo State

 Government College, Ibadan
 Ibadan Grammar School
 International School Ibadan
 Loyola College, Ibadan
 Olivet Baptist High School, Oyo
 Queen's School, Ibadan
 St Anne's School, Ibadan
 Wesley College, Ibadan

Rivers State

Several locations

 Nigerian Turkish International Colleges (locations in Abuja, Kano, Kaduna and Lagos)
 Command Secondary Schools (locations across the federation)

See also

 Education in Nigeria
 Military schools in Nigeria

Schools
Schools
Nigeria
Nigeria